Steve Gunn (born in Lansdowne, Pennsylvania, United States) is an American singer-songwriter based in Brooklyn.
He studied art and music at Temple University before moving to New York City.
Gunn was formerly a guitarist in Kurt Vile's backing band, The Violators.

Gunn has stated that his musical influences include Michael Chapman, La Monte Young, Indian music, John Fahey, Jack Rose, Robbie Basho, and Sandy Bull.

In 2021 he as a solo artist was inter alia part of the Newport Folk Festival in July.

His album Other you (Matador, 2021) comprises 11 tracks all written by himself, among them an instrumental duet with harpist Mary Lattimore. A reviewer stated: "However dreamy it gets, you stay wide awake throughout."

Discography

Albums
 Steve Gunn (2007)
 Sundowner (2008)
 Boerum Palace (2009)
 End of the City (2009) (split with Shawn David McMillen)
 Camel Throat (2010)
Sand City (2010) (with John Truscinski)
 Live at the Night Light (2011)
 Ocean Parkway (2012) (with John Truscinski)
 Golden Gunn (2013) (with Hiss Golden Messenger)
 Time Off (2013)
 Cantos De Lisboa (2014) (with Mike Cooper)
 Melodies for a Savage Fix (2014) (with Mike Gangloff)
 Way Out Weather (2014)
 Seasonal Hire (2015) (with The Black Twig Pickers)
 Steve Gunn/Kurt Vile (2015)(with Kurt Vile)
 Eyes on the Lines (2016)
 Bay Head (2017) (with John Truscinski)
 The Unseen in Between (2019)
 "Flops in New York" (2019) (with Ryley Walker and Ryan Jewell)
 Soundkeeper (2020) (with John Truscinski)
 Other You (2021)

EPs
 Too Early for the Hammer (2009)
 Livin' in Between (2020)
 Nakama (2022)

Singles
 "Human Condition" b/w "Trances" (2011)
 "Decline of the Stiff" (2011)
 "Lonesome Valley" (2013) (with Black Twig Pickers)
 "Wildwood" (2014)

References

External links
 

Year of birth missing (living people)
Living people
Guitarists from Pennsylvania
Guitarists from New York (state)
People from Lansdowne, Pennsylvania
American male singer-songwriters
Musicians from Brooklyn
Matador Records artists
Singer-songwriters from New York (state)
Singer-songwriters from Pennsylvania